Ringo the 4th is the sixth studio album by English musician Ringo Starr, released on 20 September 1977. Its title is sometimes ascribed to him being the fourth member of the Beatles. Others have suggested that it is his fourth mainstream album, taking exception to his Great American Songbook homage, Sentimental Journey, and his country-western foray, Beaucoups of Blues. However, Ringo the 4th is a dance-oriented record, crafted for him by his Atlantic Records producer, Arif Mardin.

Background and recording
After the commercial disappointment of Ringo's Rotogravure (1976), Starr decided to shift from his formula of using his well-known musician friends (notably his fellow ex-Beatles) to write songs and appear on his albums. Instead, he intensified his partnership with Vini Poncia, with whom he wrote several of the songs featured here, while using the input of different musicians. Sessions began on 5 February 1977, at Cherokee Studios in Los Angeles, produced by Arif Mardin. The first songs recorded were two unreleased tracks, "Lover Please" and "Wild Shining Stars". Near the end of the month, Starr recorded "Out on the Streets", "It's No Secret" and "Gypsies in Flight". In June, recording sessions were held at Atlantic Studios in New York. where the tracks that ended up on the album were recorded. In addition, the B-side "Just a Dream", as well as an unreleased track, "By Your Side", were recorded. Starr moved back to Cherokee Studios, where he held more sessions towards the end of the month, where a few more unreleased tracks were recorded: "Birmingham", "This Party", and a different version of "Just a Dream". David Foster played keyboards on a couple of songs, while Melissa Manchester, Luther Vandross, and Bette Midler occasionally appeared on backing vocals.

Packaging
Nancy Lee Andrews used Rita Wolf as a model in the photo shoot for the album cover. The photo used on the album cover shows Wolf's legs and she is sitting on Starr's shoulders. The back cover is a photo taken from the back of Starr and Wolf showing her bottom in tight pink pants.

Release
"Wings", backed with "Just a Dream", was released as a single in the US on 25 August 1977. On 5 September Starr promoted the single by having an interview with Los Angeles DJ Dave Herman. On 16 September, "Drowning in the Sea of Love", backed with "Just a Dream" was released in the UK. Ringo the 4th was released on 20 September in the UK, and 10 days later in the US.

The album was a failure upon its release, both commercially and critically. Never touching the UK charts, the album managed to make it to No. 162 in the US. The "Drowning in the Sea of Love" single, originally planned as the first US single, was released in the US on 18 October. Shortly thereafter, Atlantic dropped Starr from their roster. In the UK, Polydor fulfilled its three-album contractual requirement by following up with a children's album, Scouse the Mouse (1977) which featured Starr, in the lead role, performing around half of the material.

Neither of the two singles pulled from Ringo the 4th, "Wings" and "Drowning in the Sea of Love" charted in the US. In foreign countries, other songs were released as singles: "Sneaking Sally Through the Alley", backed with "Tango All Night" (Australia) and "Tango All Night", backed with "It's No Secret" (Argentina). The cover photos were by Starr's fiancée, Nancy Lee Andrews. Ringo the 4th was reissued on CD, on the same day as Ringo's Rotogravure, in the US on 16 August 1992, by Atlantic. The song "Wings" was re-recorded years later, and released on Ringo's Ringo 2012 album and again as a lead single in 2012. The album was re-issued on Valentine's Day in 2020 as two different colored vinyl variants (gold and red) by Friday Music. The album saw another reissue as part of Record Store Day in 2022 with a translucent orange vinyl along with Starr's 1983 album Old Wave.

Critical reception

Journalist Peter Palmiere states in his front cover story on Starr for DISCoveries magazine in January 2003 that "The music critics and the record buying public took the album as a joke for Ringo's voice was not suitable for the disco flavored music on Ringo the 4th". Palmiere went on to claim that Ringo the 4th destroyed Starr's career and that he never commercially recovered from it.

Music webzine Drowned in Sound contributor Hayden Woolley commented in 2015 that the disco-flavored album "sees Ringo climb aboard the booty-shaking bandwagon with all the grace of a rhinoceros mounting a swan." Wooley adds that Starr is no "Donna Summer" and that even though the album was a "critical and commercial disaster," it provides "an absolute treasure trove of unintentional comedy." Wooley draws particular attention to "Drowning in the Sea of Love," saying it "bubbles into life with synthesised stabs and a slinky funk bassline, before Ringo falls repeatedly on his face like a drunken man trying to climb down from a trampoline."

PopDose contributor David Allen Jones commented in 2017 that the album's considerable failure did not "seem to bother our boy very much—this was at the height of his LA party animal phase, and he was always seen out and about and drinking copiously and generally loving life." Jones highlighted "Can She Do It Like She Dances?," calling it one of the album's better moments: "the arrangement reminds me a lot of can-can dancing or something, appropriate given the subject matter, in which Ringo drunkenly (and I do mean drunkenly) seems to slobber all over the mike as he wonders if the object of his affection can 'do it' like she dances." Jones adds that Starr sounds "guttural and horny as hell."

In drawing comparisons to Starr's fellow Beatles, Rhino commented that "the idea of a Beatle doing disco didn't pan out nearly as well for Ringo as it did for Paul with 'Goodnight Tonight'."

Track listing
All tracks written by Ringo Starr and Vini Poncia, except where noted.

Personnel
Credits are adapted from the Ringo the 4th liner notes.

 Ringo Starr – lead vocals, drums (A1 - B1, B3)
 David Spinozza – guitar (A1 - B1, B3)
 John Tropea – guitar (A1 - B1, B3)
 Jeff Mironov – guitar (A1 - B1, B3)
 Cornell Dupree – guitar (B 2) 
 Lon Van Eaton – guitar (B 2)
 Dick Fegy – acoustic guitar (B 4)
 Danny Kortchmar – guitar  (B 5)
 David Bromberg – guitar (B 4)
 Tony Levin – bass guitar (A1 - B1, B3)
 Chuck Rainey – bass guitar (B 2, B 5)
 Hugh McDonald – bass guitar (B 4)
 Don Grolnick – keyboards (A1 - B1, B3)
 David Foster – electric guitar, clavinet (B 2), piano, keyboards (B 5)
 Jeff Gutcheon – electric piano (B 4)
 Nicky Marrero - percussion (B 2)
 Ken Bichel – synthesizer
 Steve Gadd – drums
 Michael Brecker – tenor saxophone

 Randy Brecker – trumpet, leader of brass and reeds
 Don Brooks – harmonica
 Arnold McCuller – backing vocals
 Brie Howard – backing vocals
 David Lasley – backing vocals
 Debra Gray – backing vocals
 Duitch Helmer – backing vocals
 Jim Gilstrap – backing vocals
 Joe Bean – backing vocals
 Luther Vandross – backing vocals
 Lynn Pitney – backing vocals
 Marietta Waters – backing vocals
 Maxine Anderson – backing vocals
 Melissa Manchester – backing vocals
 Rebecca Louis – backing vocals
 Robin Clark – backing vocals
 Vini Poncia – backing vocals
 Bette Midler – backing vocals (A 2)
 Gene Orloff - concertmaster

Charts

References
Footnotes

Citations

External links

JPGR's Ringo the 4th site

1977 albums
Ringo Starr albums
Polydor Records albums
Atlantic Records albums
Albums produced by Arif Mardin
Disco albums by English artists
Funk albums by English artists